Unify, is an Atos company headquartered in Munich, Germany and is present in over 100 countries. The company provides software-based enterprise unified communications including voice, Web collaboration, video conferencing and contact center, networking product and services.

Until January 21, 2016 Unify was a joint venture between The Gores Group and Siemens. Originally announced July 29, 2008, the joint venture started operating October 1, 2013, with The Gores Group holding a 51% stake, and 49% held by Siemens AG.

History

Background: Heritage (1847–2006)

Siemens Communications traces its origins to Siemens & Halske (German legal name: Telegraphen-Bauanstalt von Siemens & Halske) founded by Werner von Siemens on 12 October 1847. Siemens' first invention was the pointer telegraph. In the latter half of the 19th century, the company built long-distance telegraph lines, encompassing major projects in Germany and Russia, and the monumental Indo-European telegraph line stretching over 11,000 km from London to Calcutta. In 1897, Siemens & Halske went public.

During the first half of the 20th century, the company undertook a series of mergers and spin-offs, leading to the formation of three separate companies. The original company, Siemens & Halske, focused on communications engineering. Siemens-Schuckertwerke was founded in 1903 to develop electric power engineering. Finally, in 1932, Siemens-Reiniger-Werke was founded to specialize in electro-medical equipment. In 1966, through a major restructuring process, these main companies merged to form Siemens.

In the late 1970s, Siemens focused on information and communications technology (ICT). In 1978, it established Siemens Communication Systems, which, in 1985, was reorganized into two divisions: Siemens Communication Systems for public network products, and Siemens Information Systems for PBX and computer-related products. Entering the globalization era of the 1990s, these two divisions made acquisitions. In 1989, the PBX division initiated a structured purchase of ROLM from IBM, renaming it ROLM Systems, and completed the purchase in 1992 as Siemens-ROLM Communications. The same year, the company acquired a 40% stake in GEC Plessey Telecommunications (GPT) which evolved into the UK operations of the current company. In 1991, the carrier networks division acquired Stromberg-Carlson from The Plessey Company plc. In 1996, the PBX businesses of Mercury Communications, a subsidiary of UK-based Cable & Wireless were also acquired.

In late 1998, Siemens undertook a major restructuring into four main divisions: power generation, industry, rail systems, and information and communications (ICN). As part of the ICN Division, Siemens Information & Communication Networks (SICN) — later to be commonly known as Siemens Communications (Siemens COM) — became Siemens's biggest business unit. Its focus was to Internet-based network technologies, as it was predicted that global data traffic volume would surpass voice telephony traffic in the early part of the 21st century. In addition, Siemens COM placed greater emphasis on the US market, dominated at the time by Nortel, Lucent, and the emerging Cisco; to that end, the company made two American acquisitions, Castle Networks and Argon Networks in 1999.

In March, 2002, Siemens Communications was divided into two major business units - one for public mobile networks and fixed networks; and the other for enterprise networks.

Siemens Enterprise Communications (2006–2013)

The evolution of Siemens Enterprise Communications began in June, 2006, when Siemens divided Siemens COM into two pieces.
On June 19, 2006, the carrier networks business was merged with Nokia's Network Business Group to form a new joint venture, Nokia Siemens Networks. On October 1, 2006, Siemens Enterprise Communications was created as a wholly owned subsidiary of Siemens. Since then, the business focused on unified communications.

In late July 2008, Siemens announced a joint venture with American private equity company The Gores Group (headed by Alec Gores), integrating two Gores Group businesses, Enterasys Networks and SER Solutions.

Enterasys operated as a subsidiary of Siemens Enterprise Communications until 12 September 2013, when Extreme Networks, announced that an agreement to purchase Enterasys in an all-cash transaction valued at US$180 million.

Unify (2013–present)
In October 2013, Siemens Enterprise Communications was rebranded to Unify.

In November 2015 it was announced that IT services company Atos would purchase Unify from The Gores Group/Siemens for 340 million euro. The acquisition was completed in January 2016.

In January 2023, Atos announced it entered into exclusive negotiations with Mitel for the sale of its Unified Communications & Collaboration business (Unify).

Products and services
Unify is a communications provider that develops, deploys, and manages unified communications, network infrastructure and security and managed and professional services for large enterprises and small and medium enterprises, both directly and via partners.

Its primary product brands are OpenScape (unified communications applications), HiPath (converged enterprise communications) and Circuit (SaaS Team Communication). The company announced OpenScape with Microsoft in 2003.
Unify demonstrated SIP and service-oriented architecture with OpenScape. The company’s services cover managed services, professional services, and maintenance and support services.

OpenScape scored in the Leaders Quadrant in Gartner's Magic Quadrant surveys for both voice and UC. OpenScape UC received the top rating in Enterprise Connect's UC RFP session in 2012 and 2013.

On 28 October 2014 Unify launched a SaaS Team Communication product called Circuit which was previously codenamed Project Ansible. Due to agreement between the new owner Atos and former owner, from 2016 Circuit was further developed on-the-go and in 2017 launched as a unified communication and collaboration platform for the whole Siemens.

References

External links 
 Unify

Siemens
German companies established in 2008
Companies based in Munich
Technology companies established in 2008
Multinational joint-venture companies
Networking hardware companies
Telephony equipment
Unified communications
German brands